Peter Steinbrueck (born October 14, 1957) is an American architect and politician from Seattle, Washington. He is the principal and founder of Steinbrueck Urban Strategies and was a city councilmember from 1997 to 2008. He also previously served as a Seattle Port Commissioner from 2018 to 2022.

Early life and education
Steinbrueck was born and raised in Seattle, and is the son of noted architect Victor Steinbrueck (1911–1985) and artist Elaine Pearl Worden. He graduated from Lakeside School, received his bachelor of arts degree in government from Bowdoin College, and a master of architecture degree from the University of Washington College of Built Environments. Before becoming an architect, he began his early working life at age 16 as a skilled carpenter, and later a building contractor.  He is a distinguished Harvard Loeb Fellow with Graduate School of Design (2010).

Political activities
Steinbrueck was a member of the Seattle City Council, first elected to the council on November 4, 1997, and immediately sworn in to fill an unfinished term. He was elected to full council terms in 1999 and 2003 and served through 2007. Steinbrueck served as council president during 2002 and 2003. He served as chair of the Housing and Human Services Committee in his first four years on the council, later the Parks, Education, and Libraries Committee, and in his final four years, he chaired the Urban Development and Planning Committee, with a portfolio of the city's long-term comprehensive planning, land use regulation, city design, and development standards.

In late 2012, Steinbrueck announced his candidacy for Mayor of Seattle in the 2013 election he came in third in a crowded race, but failed to move past the primary election. On November 7, 2017, Steinbrueck was elected as Seattle Port Commissioner, Position 4.

Steinbrueck served one term on the Port of Seattle Commission beginning in 2018 where he is credited with creating the Port's $20 million dollar South King County Community Fund, co-chaired the Port's Art Committee restoring art funding at Sea-Tac Airport from 1/2 percent to 1 percent of capital spending and extended the program Port-wide. Steinbrueck authored a motion passed by the full Commission developing a task force on Policing and Civil Rights charged with examining Port Police hiring, training, promotions, and the use of force. Steinbrueck was President of the Commission during the Port's response to the COVID-19 pandemic and successfully lead the organization to financial stability without staff layoffs as Port revenues reduced dramatically with flight cancelations and the cancelation of the cruise season.

Educational activities
Steinbrueck has been a visiting instructor at the University of Washington’s College of the Built Environments, and is a frequent speaker, commentator, and writer on the emerging framework for advancing environmental sustainability of cities and regions. In 2009, Steinbrueck was named a Loeb Fellow in the Graduate School of Design at Harvard University, where he completed an academic year 2009-10 of independent research focused on the environment, climate change and urban sustainability in the United States. Steinbrueck is a member of the Harvard Center for the Environment's Working Group for Sustainable Cities.

In 2007, after leaving his City Council position, Steinbrueck founded his own firm, Steinbrueck Urban Strategies, an urban planning, urban sustainability and urban design consulting practice.

Awards and recognition

The American Institute of Architects (AIA) recognized Steinbrueck with its Young Architects Award in 1999 for his public and civic contributions affecting affordable housing, homelessness, civic design, historic preservation, and the environment. In 2006, the AIA elevated him to membership in its College of Fellows for his achievements in public office and contributions to the profession and society. In 2002 Steinbrueck received the Public Sector Achievement Award from the National Alliance to End Homelessness for his commitment to reducing and preventing homelessness through systematic change. In 2012, Steinbrueck was recipient of the U.S. Federal Executives Board's Outstanding Public service Award.

Other local, state, and national organizations that have honored him including the Seattle Education Association (Hero Award, 2004), Seattle Human Services Coalition (Stewardship Award, 2006), Seattle magazine's Most Influential People (2006), Seattle Fire Fighters Local 27 (Red Helmet Award, 2008), and the Washington State Office of Archaeology and Historic Preservation (Outstanding Career Achievement in Historic Preservation, 2008).

Notes

References
 Knute Berger, “The passion of Peter Steinbrueck” (Crosscut, December 19, 2007)
 Knute Berger, “Peter Steinbrueck decides” (Crosscut, April 17, 2009)
 Sharon Pian Chan, “What’s next for Peter Steinbrueck?” (The Seattle Times, December 28, 2007), “Peter Steinbrueck, known for his impassioned speeches and contentious nature, plans to remain an activist when his term on the Seattle City Council expires Monday.”
  2017 AIA College of Fellows History & Directory

Fellows of the American Institute of Architects
Architects from Seattle
Bowdoin College alumni
University of Washington College of Built Environments alumni
Seattle City Council members
Living people
1957 births
Lakeside School alumni
Harvard Graduate School of Design